Galtür is a village and ski resort in the upper Paznaun valley in Austrian state of Tyrol located in the Central Eastern Alps 35 km southwest of Landeck near the border of Vorarlberg and Switzerland.

History

Galtür was settled by the Engadiners from the south, the Walsers and Vorarlbergers from the west, and Tyroleans from the east. Today the cultivation work of the Engadiners is remembered in the name Galtür, meaning Cultura. During the Thirty Years' War, Galtür was badly damaged. The church and many houses were burned down. The first roads leading through the Paznaun were built in the 19th century. During that period, Galtür consisted of a church, an inn, and eight houses, and was considered very poor. After the first hotel was built, the Jamtalhütte was soon constructed. With the advent of tourism, Galtür and the valley became prosperous.

On February 23, 1999, an avalanche descended on Galtür. The avalanche was considered the worst in the Alps in 40 years. Due to the continuing danger of avalanches, thousands of tourists were evacuated from the Paznaun valley via air-lift. Military and civil helicopters from Austria, Germany, Switzerland, France, and the United States were engaged in one of the biggest rescue operations of Austria's recent history. The avalanche was caused by three major weather systems from the Atlantic that produced large snowfalls totaling around 4 meters in the area. Alternating freezing and thawing created a weak layer on top of an existing snow pack, followed by additional snowfall. High winds created large snow drifts, and eventually caused roughly 170,000 tons of snow to fall on the village.

Ski Resort

Galtür is a popular tourist destination in winter. There are 40 km (25 mi) of perfectly prepared pistes and a varied selection of slopes to explore. Galtür is a family-friendly ski area. Most ski slopes range from easy to medium difficulty. In addition, ski pros find challenging runs and many deep snow slopes without any tracks. There are 10 mountain railways and lifts, including the eight-seater Alpkogel gondola. Wednesday evenings, night skiing is possible on a floodlit piste.

Galtür's ski resort is called Silvapark and is located 2 kilometres outside the main village in the small village of Wirl. Ski buses run along the main road through Galtür between the ski area and other destinations in the valley, including Ischgl, Kappl, and See. There are stops in Galtür at the Hotel Alpenrose, Dorfplatz, and Alpinarium, as well as one stop next to the Birkhahnbahn chair lift in Wirl. In Wirl, skiers and snowboarders can take either the Birkahahnbahn chair lift or the Alpkogelbahn Gondola up onto the mountain.

Silvapark offers 40 km of groomed pistes served by 3 chair lifts, 1 gondola and 5 smaller tow lifts. Many of the runs are marked Blue and Red, making the resort accessible to families and beginners. In addition to these, the resort also offers a number of more difficult Red and Black runs, which means, coupled with the off piste possibilities, the resort caters for more advanced skiers and snowboarders too. Off piste opportunities through trees and between runs, particularly surrounding the Breitspitzbahn chair lift, are available, even for less experienced skiers. This area is much quieter and has better on-piste conditions.

There are several mountain huts and restaurants on the mountain which offer traditional Austrian cuisine and a friendly atmosphere. Most offer indoor and outdoor dining areas as well as smoking and non-smoking areas respectively. At the bottom of the Alpkogelbahn Gondola, there are a number of hotels which have ski in ski out facilities. These hotels offer accommodation and facilities for those who would rather not take a ski bus.

Climate

Gallery

References

External links

 Galtür
 Historie of Galtür (german)
 Alpinarium Galtür
 Tourismoffice Paznaun Galtür
 Silvretta Galtür Cablecars

Ski areas and resorts in Austria
Cities and towns in Landeck District
Verwall Alps
Silvretta Alps